Dany Wilson (10 December 1982 in Westmoreland – 13 December 2011 in Montego Bay) was a male beach volleyball and volleyball player from Jamaica, who won the silver medal in the men's competition in home soil at the NORCECA Beach Volleyball Circuit 2009 in Jamaica) and the bronze medal at Boca Chica, Dominican Republic, partnering Mark Lewis in 2008.

In Indoor volleyball, he helped his national team to finish in 3rd place 2007  at the 2010 FIVB Men's World Championship qualification NORCECA Pool D in Kingston, Jamaica.

Clubs
  Vikings

Awards

National Team
 NORCECA Beach Volleyball Circuit Nicaragua 2009  Silver Medal
 NORCECA Beach Volleyball Circuit Jamaica 2009  Silver Medal
 NORCECA Beach Volleyball Circuit Boca Chica 2008  Bronze Medal
 Sizzlin Sand Beach Volleyball Tour 2008 Barbados  Silver Medal
 Sizzlin Sand Beach Volleyball Tour 2007 Antigua  Gold Medal

References

External links
 
 
 FIVB Indoor Profile

1982 births
2011 deaths
Jamaican men's volleyball players
Jamaican beach volleyball players
Men's beach volleyball players